John Howard (born July 21, 1981 in Weno) is a sprinter from the Federated States of Micronesia. He came 7th in Heat 6 of the 100 metres Preliminaries at the 2004 Summer Olympics and finished 5th in Heat 3 of the 100 metres Preliminaries at the 2012 Summer Olympics. His twin brother Jack Howard competed at the 2008 Summer Olympics.

Achievements

References

External links
 
Sports reference biography

1981 births
Living people
People from Chuuk State
Federated States of Micronesia male sprinters
Athletes (track and field) at the 2004 Summer Olympics
Athletes (track and field) at the 2012 Summer Olympics
Olympic track and field athletes of the Federated States of Micronesia